Dietrich Schmidt (27 June 1919 – 6 March 2002) was a Luftwaffe night fighter ace and recipient of the Knight's Cross of the Iron Cross during World War II. The Knight's Cross of the Iron Cross and was awarded to recognise extreme battlefield bravery or successful military leadership.

Night fighter career

Following the 1939 aerial Battle of the Heligoland Bight, bombing missions by the Royal Air Force (RAF) shifted to the cover of darkness, initiating the Defence of the Reich campaign. By mid-1940, Generalmajor (Brigadier General) Josef Kammhuber had established a night air defense system dubbed the Kammhuber Line. It consisted of a series of control sectors equipped with radars and searchlights and an associated night fighter. Each sector, named a Himmelbett (canopy bed), would direct the night fighter into visual range with target bombers. In 1941, the Luftwaffe started equipping night fighters with airborne radar such as the Lichtenstein radar. This airborne radar did not come into general use until early 1942.

Oberleutnant Schmidt was initially posted to 8./Nachtjagdgeschwader 1 (NJG 1—1st Night Fighter Wing) in September 1941, based at Twente in the Netherlands. He claimed his first victory on the night of 24/25 March 1943, a Handley Page Halifax bomber over Enkhuizen. On 15 June 1943 Schmidt was appointed Staffelkapitän of 8./NJG 1, having claimed five victories by this time.

On the night of 1/2 January 1944, he claimed an Avro Lancaster bomber shot down near Ramsel for his 10th victory. On the night of 14/15 January 1944, Schmidt claimed his 12th aerial victory. The RAF had targeted Braunschweig with 498 bombers that night. Schmidt was credited with the destruction of Lancaster ND357 from No. 156 Squadron.

He claimed three victories in a single night on 3/4 May, 22/23 May, and 28/29 July. Schmidt was awarded the Knight's Cross of the Iron Cross on 27 July for 32 victories. Schmidt transferred as Staffelkapitän to 9./NJG 1 in December 1944. He added five further victories to raise his victory total to 43 by the end of the war. 
Schmidt was then interned by British troops at Schleswig-Holstein, and released in August 1945.

He attended Heidelberg University obtaining a doctorate in Chemistry, married and fathered three children. Schmidt retired in 1984.

Dietrich Schmidt was credited with 43 victories in 171 missions. All his victories were recorded at night.

Summary of career

Aerial victory claims
Author Spick lists him with 39 aerial victories, claimed in 171 combat missions. Foreman, Parry and Mathews, authors of Luftwaffe Night Fighter Claims 1939 – 1945, researched the German Federal Archives and found records for 43 nocturnal victory claims. Mathews and Foreman also published Luftwaffe Aces — Biographies and Victory Claims, listing Schmidt with 40 aerial victories, plus one further unconfirmed claim.

Awards
 Flugzeugführerabzeichen
 Front Flying Clasp of the Luftwaffe
 Iron Cross (1939) 2nd and 1st Class
 Honour Goblet of the Luftwaffe (Ehrenpokal der Luftwaffe) on 24 April 1944 as Oberleutnant and pilot
 German Cross in Gold on 1 October 1944 as Oberleutnant in the 8./Nachtjagdgeschwader 1
 Knight's Cross of the Iron Cross on 27 July 1944 as Oberleutnant and Staffelkapitän of the 8./Nachtjagdgeschwader 1

Notes

References

Citations

Bibliography

External links
TracesOfWar.com
Aces of the Luftwaffe

1919 births
2002 deaths
German World War II flying aces
Recipients of the Gold German Cross
Recipients of the Knight's Cross of the Iron Cross
Military personnel from Karlsruhe
German prisoners of war in World War II held by the United Kingdom
Heidelberg University alumni
People from the Republic of Baden